Major Island Soccer Organization is an amateur soccer league that is located in Oahu, Hawaii.  Within this soccer league there are three divisions, Division I, Division II, and Division III. Divisions I and II have 10 teams each. Division III has 7.

In the past, there were two different seasons in a year.  The spring season would start in the middle of January and end in the first week of July.  The fall season would begin in August and end in December.  In the present day, the league president issued a change of the scheduling process.  Instead of having two short seasons, they decided to make one long season which lasts approximately a year.  The new season starts in the August and ends in July.  This new long soccer season started in the Fall of 2006.

The soccer participants vary in age.  The ages range from high school students to adults in their 40s. Soccer has been on the rise in Hawaii and allowing high school players to participate with older, mature, and better players will allow them to learn and grow.  Soccer players out of high school or just out of college have an opportunity to keep up their fitness as well as their soccer abilities.

Within the league there is a tournament in which all teams participate in, the Robledo Cup. This gives a chance to the second and third division teams to prove that they are worthy to be in the first division. At the end of every season, the team from Division II who wins their season is promoted to Division I.  The same happens with the winner of Division III. The team in Division I and II with the fewest points at the end of the season will be relegated and sent down to Division II and Division III respectively

Goals
The goals of the league are:
 To provide an amateur soccer league where participants can have a competitive soccer environment.
 To encourage sportsmanship from the players for the public.  A positive example should be shown for future soccer players.
 To build a setting for young, gifted soccer players to perform against quality soccer stars.

Division I Teams
1. Aloha Amazon
2. Honolulu Bulls
3. Bulls Junior
4. Kapaolono Dawgs
5. International Honolulu
6. Kamikaze
7. Lanikai Tuesday FC
8. Rush Latin HFC
9. Waipio FC 
10. Koa United

Division II Teams
1. Hawaii Rush
2. Lanikai Thursday
3. Slammers Real HFC
4. Boca Honolulu
5. Kahekili
6. Kap Park
7. Ronins
8. Faded Premier
9. Phoenix Holokahi
10. Vaiete SC
11. Stoked FC
12. Galaxy FC

Division III Teams
1.Boca West
2.Kaka'ako United
3.Shoguns
4.Team XI
5.Undertow

Notable alumni
Duke Hashimoto (MLS: Real Salt Lake, Utah)

See also 
 Hawaii Soccer Association

External links
 https://web.archive.org/web/20070304072728/http://www.islandsoccer.com/island.htm
 http://www.hscbulls.com

References
MISO (Men's Island Soccer Organization).  Retrieved February 20, 2007, from https://web.archive.org/web/20070304072728/http://www.islandsoccer.com/island.htm

Soccer in Hawaii
United States Adult Soccer Association leagues
Regional Soccer leagues in the United States